Jangaon Municipality is the civic body that oversees the civic needs of the town of Jangaon in the Indian state of Telangana.

History
The first local administrator with the designation of tahsildar was appointed in 1935 by then Nizam king to Jangaon town.
Tahsildar as chairman and selected five eminent persons of the town for the committee. The committee ruled for 17 years until 1952 when the first elections were held and the town was divided into 14 wards as a third grade municipality. It was upgraded to second grade in the year 2010 with 28 municipal wards. Now increased to 30 municipal wards.

List of Chairpersons
List of Elected Chairpersons of Jangaon Municipality along with number of council members in wards, First Election conducted in 1952, following 1959, 1966, 1982, 1987, 1992, 2000, 2005, 2014, and 2020 held in January.

Jurisdiction
The jurisdiction of the civic body is spread over 17.49 km2 (6.75 sq mi).

Election 2020 
Election held on 23 January 2020, counting and results came on 25 January 2020. There were 40,099 voters in 30 wards. The position of Chair-person was assigned to the General (Woman).

Political parties performance

List of Councilors

Election 2014 
Elections were held on March 30, 2014. There were 35,934 voters in the municipality. The position of Chair-person was assigned to the General (Woman).

Political parties performance

List of Counselors

References 

Cities and towns in Jangaon district
Jangaon district